The 2019 STP 500 was a Monster Energy NASCAR Cup Series race that was held on March 24, 2019, at Martinsville Speedway in Ridgeway, Virginia. Contested over 500 laps on the .526 mile (.847 km) paperclip-shaped short track, it was the sixth race of the 2019 Monster Energy NASCAR Cup Series season.

Report

Background

Martinsville Speedway is an International Speedway Corporation-owned NASCAR stock car racing track located in Henry County, in Ridgeway, Virginia, just to the south of Martinsville. At  in length, it is the shortest track in the Monster Energy NASCAR Cup Series. The track was also one of the first paved oval tracks in NASCAR, being built in 1947 by H. Clay Earles. It is also the only remaining race track that has been on the NASCAR circuit from its beginning in 1948.

Entry list

Practice

First practice

Final practice

Qualifying

Qualifying results

 William Byron, D. J. Kennington, and Jeb Burton all starting at the back due to failing inspection.

Race

Stage Results

Stage One
Laps: 130

Stage Two
Laps: 130

Final Stage Results

Stage Three
Laps: 240

Race statistics
 Lead changes: 4 among 3 different drivers (Laps Led: Keselowski (446), Elliott (49), Logano (5)) 
 Cautions/Laps: 7 for 56
 Red flags: 0
 Time of race: 3 hours, 21 minutes and 54 seconds
 Average speed:

Media

Television
Fox Sports covered their 19th race at the Martinsville Speedway. Mike Joy, nine-time Martinsville winner Jeff Gordon and 11-time Martinsville winner Darrell Waltrip called the race from the booth. Jamie Little, Vince Welch and Matt Yocum handled pit road duties for the entire race.

Radio
MRN had the radio call for the race which was also simulcasted on Sirius XM NASCAR Radio. Alex Hayden, Jeff Striegle and seven-time Martinsville winner Rusty Wallace called the race in the booth as the cars raced down the frontstretch. Dave Moody called the race from atop the turn 3 stands as the field raced down the backstretch. Winston Kelley, Steve Post and Dillon Welch worked pit road for the radio side.

Standings after the race

Drivers' Championship standings

Manufacturers' Championship standings

Note: Only the first 16 positions are included for the driver standings.

References

STP 500
STP 500
STP 500
NASCAR races at Martinsville Speedway